The Caribbean reef squid (Sepioteuthis sepioidea), commonly called the reef squid, is a species of small, torpedo-shaped squid with undulating fins that extend nearly the entire length of the body, approximately  in length.

Distribution and habitat
The Caribbean reef squid is found throughout the Caribbean Sea as well as off the coast of Florida, commonly in small schools of four to thirty in the shallows associated with reefs. The habitat of the Reef Squid changes according to the squid's stage of life and size. Young small squid typically congregate in shallow turtle grass near islands and remain several centimeters to two meters from the surface to avoid bird predators. Adults venture out into open water and can be found in depths up to 150 m. The Caribbean reef squid is the only squid species commonly sighted by divers over inshore reefs in the Florida, Bahamas and Caribbean regions.

Feeding behavior
This species, like most squids, is a voracious eater and typically consumes 30–60% of its body weight daily. Prey is caught using the club-like end of the long tentacles which are then pulled towards the mouth supported by the shorter arms. Like other cephalopods, it has a strong beak which it uses to cut the prey into parts so that the raspy tongue, or radula, can be used to further process the food. It consumes small fish, other molluscs, and crustaceans.

Communication
Caribbean reef squid have been shown to communicate using a variety of color, shape, and texture changes.  Squid are capable of rapid changes in skin color and pattern through nervous control of chromatophores.  In addition to camouflage and appearing larger in the face of a threat, squids use color, patterns, and flashing to communicate with one another in various courtship rituals. Caribbean reef squid can send one message via color patterns to a squid on their right, while they send another message to a squid on their left.

Reproduction
Like other cephalopods, the Caribbean reef squid, is semelparous, dying after reproducing. Females lay their eggs then die immediately after. The males, however, can fertilize many females in a short period of time before they die. Females lay the eggs in well-protected areas scattered around the reefs. After competing with 2-5 other males, the largest male approaches the female and gently strokes her with his tentacles. At first she may indicate her alarm by flashing a distinct pattern, but the male soon calms her by blowing water at her and jetting gently away. He returns repeatedly until the female accepts him, however the pair may continue this dance or courting for up to an hour. The male then attaches a sticky packet of sperm to the female's body. As he reaches out with the sperm packet, he displays a pulsating pattern. The female places the packet in her seminal receptacle, finds appropriate places to lay her eggs in small clusters, and then dies.

References

Squid
Molluscs of the Atlantic Ocean
Cephalopods described in 1823
Taxa named by Henri Marie Ducrotay de Blainville